Gungsong Gungtsen was the only known son of Songtsen Gampo (b.605 or 617? 649d.? – 655d.), the first Tibetan Emperor and the Prince of Tibetan Empire in Yarlung Dynasty.

Early life
Gungsong Guntsen Born in 605 C.E in Lhasa Tibet by his grandfather Namri Songtsen Reign untiled his Life's (b.605 – 618) 13 to 12 years his Life Mentioned to Little in Sources of Tibet Scripters, his Birth And Middle Life was learning and lessoning is the Basic points. and later his Father Songtsen Gampo reign (618 – 649d.)

But aftermath (b.605 – 649d.) aged of 44 his Death, but his cause and date of death are disputed. Some say he died in 655 C.E and ruling 5 years and Succeeded his son

Biography

Songtsen Gampo is said to have had five wives, the Nepalese princess Bhrikuti, and the Chinese Princess Wencheng, both devout Buddhists, are the best known, but he also married daughters of the King of Zhangzhung and the King of the Western Xia, as well as one each from the Ruyong and Mong (or Mang) clans (although other lists exist).

Gungsong Gungtsen was born to Mangza (or Mongsa) Tricham, the noble woman from the Mang or Mong clan of Tölung, a valley to the west of Lhasa.

It seems most unlikely that Songtsen Gampo handed over power to his son after his marriage to Princess Wencheng in 641, as she was married to the ruling monarch and there is no mention of such an event in the Chinese or Tibetan Annals. If Gungsong Gungtsen was married and had a son before 641, he was most probably born sometime before 625.

He is traditionally said to have been born at a nine-storied palace known as the "Celestial Auspicious Mansion of Draglha", built by Bhrikuti to the south of Lhasa. It is said that a shrine and a stupa were then built by his father on a rocky mountain near Yerpa which resembled a seated image of Tara.

Some accounts say that when Gungsong Gungtsen reached the age of thirteen (twelve by Western reckoning), his father, Songtsen Gampo, retired and he then ruled the country for five years (which could have been the period when Songtsen Gampo was working on the constitution). Gungsong Gungtsen also married 'A-zha Mang-mo-rje when he was thirteen and they had a son, Mangsong Mangtsen (r. 650-676 CE). Gungsong Gungtsen is said to have only ruled for five years when he died at eighteen. His father, Songtsen Gampo, took the throne again. He is said to have been buried at Donkhorda, the site of the royal tombs, to the left of the tomb of his grandfather Namri Songtsen (gNam-ri Srong-btsan). The dates for these events are very unclear.

It is unclear whether Gungsong Gungtsen was really enthroned as Emperor during the five years he is said to have reigned, nor is there any mention of his reign in the Chinese or Tibetan Annals. He is, therefore, sometimes not included among the list of Tibetan rulers.

References

History of Tibet
Tibetan people
Tibetan emperors
7th-century births
7th-century deaths